Pai is a surname from coastal Karnataka, Kerala and Goa in India. It is found among Hindus of the Goud Saraswat Brahmin community, especially of Madhwa Section following either Kashi Math or Gokarna Matha.

The name is also in use among some Konkani Catholics who trace their ancestry to the Goud Saraswat Brahmins of Karnataka, Kerala and Goa.

Notable people

The following is a list of notable people with last name Pai.

 Ajit Pai, Indian cricketer, not to be confused with former FCC chairman with the same name
 Ajit Varadaraj Pai, American lawyer; Chairman of the Federal Communications Commission (2017–2021)
 Ammembal Subba Rao Pai, lawyer and founder of Canara Bank
 Anant Pai (1937–2011), noted Indian educationist and creator of  comics ( also known as Uncle Pai )
 G. Vasantha Pai (1921–2009), Senior Advocate – Madras High Court and Indian Supreme Court, Member of Legislative Council (MLC), Freedom Fighter
 Kuldeep M Pai, Musician, Music Guru, Ashtavadhani
 Laxman Pai (1926–2021), Artist. Winner of Padma Shri, Padma Bhushan Govt of India. 
 M. Govinda Pai (1883–1963), poet
Mukundrao Pai (1883–1948), Indian cricketer, member of the first Indian cricket team to tour England in 1911
 P. Ananth Pai, First batch 1947 IAS, GM Indian Railways, Born Panemangalore 1923–1990
 M. Kesava Pai(1879–1965), doctor, Rao Bahadur, OBE (Order of the British Empire awarded in 1932)
 M. Purushotham Pai (1906–1991), ICS, Chief Secretary of Andhra Pradesh, Chairman of SCCL, Board Member-Larsen & Toubro, Chairman of APSRTC
 T. M. A. Pai (1898–1978), banker and philanthropist
 Tonse Ramesh Upendra Pai, Chairman of Maharashtra Apex Corporation Ltd.
 T. A. Pai (1922–1981), banker and founder of T. A. Pai Management Institute, Founder of Syndicate Bank
 T.V. Mohandas Pai, chairman of Manipal University
 Ramdas Madhav Pai, Chancellor of Manipal University

References

External links
Rashtrakavi M. Govind Pai
Freedom Fighter Devanna Pai
Dr. Padmini Pai

Indian surnames
Karnataka society
Konkani-language surnames